22 Squadron may refer to:

 No. 22 Squadron RAF, a unit of the Royal Air Force
 22 Squadron SAAF, a unit of the South African Air Force
 103 Squadron (22 Squadron), a unit of the Portuguese Air Force
 No. 22 Squadron (Finland), a fighter squadron of the Finnish Air Force